Elections to Maidstone Borough Council were held on 22 May 2014. One-third of the borough council (20 members) were up for election. European Parliament Elections were held on the same day.

Overall results
The Conservatives lost overall control of the council by losing four seats. The Liberal Democrats lost one seat. UKIP gained four seats, and Labour gained one seat.

Ward results

References & notes

2014 English local elections
2014
2010s in Kent